I Will Survive is a 1993, South Korean historical drama film. It was entered into the 18th Moscow International Film Festival where Lee Deok-hwa won the award for Best Actor.

Plot 
Man-seok is an executioner from the butcher caste and therefore discriminated against. One day, he receives a request from a noble family that one of their condemned be executed without his head being cut off. Man-seok does as instructed, but when his payment is delivered by Sug-young, the daughter of the executed, he rapes her, motivated by his deep resentment against the ruling elite. Later, she is arrested and sold into slavery. Feeling guilty, Man-seok buys her freedom, and the two eventually fall in love and settle down to a peaceful married life. However, their happiness is threatened when they are involved in a conspiracy against the enemies of Sug-young's family.

Cast 
 Lee Deok-hwa ... Man-seok
 Lee Mi-yeon ... Sug-young
 Jang Hang-sun
 Lee Il-woong
 Nam Bo-won
 Yang Taek-jo
 Sunwoo Yong-nyeo

References

External links 
 
 
 Review at Koreanfilm.org

1990s historical drama films
1993 films
1990s Korean-language films
Films set in the Joseon dynasty
South Korean historical drama films